Buck v. Jewell-LaSalle Realty Co., 283 U.S. 191 (1931), was a United States Supreme Court case in which the Court held a hotel operator which provided headphones connected to a centrally controlled radio receiver was guilty of copyright infringement, because "reception of a radio broadcast and its translation into audible sound is not a mere audition of the original program. It is essentially a reproduction."

References

External links
 

1931 in United States case law
United States Supreme Court cases
United States Supreme Court cases of the Hughes Court
United States copyright case law
Overruled United States Supreme Court decisions